Parodia magnifica is a species of flowering plant in the family Cactaceae, native to southern Brazil. Populations are sparse and fragmented, and it has been designated as “Endangered” by the IUCN Red List.

In cultivation it must be kept above , so in temperate regions is grown under glass. It has gained the Royal Horticultural Society's Award of Garden Merit.

Synonyms
 Notocactus magnificus 
 Eriocactus magnificus

The plant may still be found listed under these synonyms in the horticultural literature.

References

C.M. Ritz, L. Martins, R. Mecklenburg, V. Goremykin and F.H. Hellwig, (2007). The molecular phylogeny of Rebutia (Cactaceae) and its allies demonstrates the influence of paleogeography on the evolution of South American mountain cacti, American Journal of Botany. 94:1321-1332.

magnifica
Flora of Brazil